The Router Advertisement Daemon (radvd) is an open-source software product that implements link-local advertisements of IPv6 router addresses and IPv6 routing prefixes using the Neighbor Discovery Protocol (NDP) as specified in .

Daemon
The Router Advertisement Daemon is used by system administrators in stateless autoconfiguration(.) methods of network hosts on Internet Protocol version 6 networks.

When IPv6 hosts configure their network interface controllers, they multicast router solicitation (RS) requests onto the network to discover available routers. Radvd answers requests with router advertisement (RA) messages. In addition, radvd periodically multicasts RA packets to the attached link to update network hosts. The router advertisement messages contain the routing prefix used on the link, the link maximum transmission unit (MTU), and the address of the responsible default router.

See also

 Dynamic Host Configuration Protocol (DHCP)
 Domain Name System (DNS)
 Neighbor Discovery Protocol
 Netsh on Microsoft Windows covers similar functionality

References

External links
Radvd web site
Source code

IPv6
Free network-related software
Free software programmed in C